Porpoise Bay can refer to:
Porpoise Bay, Antarctica
Porpoise Bay (New Zealand)
Porpoise Bay Provincial Park, Canada